Scorpius (♏) is a constellation of the zodiac, named after the ancient Greek word for scorpion.

Scorpius may also refer to:

Arts and entertainment
 Scorpius (novel), a James Bond novel by John Gardner
 "Scorpius" (Doctor Who audio), an audio drama episode of the Cyberman audio series based on Doctor Who
 Scorpius (Farscape), a fictional alien in the TV series Farscape
 Scorpius, a fictional villain in the Power Rangers Lost Galaxy TV series
 Scorpius, a fictional robot in the pinball video game Sonic Spinball
 "Scorpius", a song by band Midnight Juggernauts
 Scorpius Malfoy, a fictional character from J.K. Rowling’s “Harry Potter” series

Other uses
 Euscorpius, a genus of scorpions also known as Scorpius
 Scorpius (electronic warfare system), a defensive electronic warfare system.

See also
 Scorpio (astrology) (♏)